Matacoto District is one of eight districts of the Yungay Province in Peru.

Ethnic groups 
The people in the district are mainly indigenous citizens of Quechua descent. Quechua is the language which the majority of the population (78.33%) learnt to speak in childhood, 21.10% of the residents started speaking using the Spanish language (2007 Peru Census).

References

Districts of the Yungay Province
Districts of the Ancash Region